The 2012–13 Women's FIH Hockey World League was the inaugural edition of the women's field hockey national team league series. The tournament started in August 2012 in Prague, Czech Republic and finished in December 2013 in San Miguel de Tucumán, Argentina.

The Semifinals of this competition also served as a qualifier for the 2014 Women's Hockey World Cup as the 6 highest placed teams apart from the host nation and the five continental champions qualified.

The Netherlands won the tournament's Final round for the first time after defeating Australia 5–1 in the final match. England won the third place match by defeating host nation Argentina 4–2 on a penalty shootout after a 1–1 draw.

Qualification
Each national association member of the International Hockey Federation (FIH) had the opportunity to compete in the tournament, and after seeking entries to participate, 51 teams were announced to compete. However, for different reasons, the final count of participating teams was 45.

The 8 teams ranked between 1st and 8th in the FIH World Rankings current as of April 2011 received an automatic bye to the Semifinals while the 8 teams ranked between 9th and 16th received an automatic bye to Round 2. Those sixteen teams, shown with qualifying rankings, were the following:

 (1)
 (2)
 (3)
 (4)
 (5)
 (6)
 (7)
 (8)
 (9)
 (10)
 (11)
 (12)
 (13)
 (14)
 (15)
 (16)

Schedule

Round 1

Round 2

 – Ukraine and Canada withdrew from participating.

Semifinals

Final

Final ranking
FIH issued a final ranking to determine the world ranking. The final ranking was as follows:

References

   
Women's FIH Hockey World League
2012 in women's field hockey
2013 in women's field hockey